The 1935 South Dakota State Jackrabbits football team was an American football team that represented South Dakota State University in the North Central Conference (NCC) during the 1935 college football season. In its second season under head coach Red Threlfall, the team compiled a 4–4–1 record and outscored opponents by a total of 123 to 92.

During the season, the team's quarterback Sol Kramer was ruled ineligible. Halfback Paul Miller was the offensive star and played for the Green Bay Packers from 1936 to 1938.

Schedule

References

South Dakota State
South Dakota State Jackrabbits football seasons
South Dakota State Jackrabbits football